Artemisia tridentata, commonly called big sagebrush, Great Basin sagebrush or (locally) simply sagebrush, is an aromatic shrub from the family Asteraceae, which grows in arid and semi-arid conditions, throughout a range of cold desert, steppe, and mountain habitats in the Intermountain West of North America. The vernacular name "sagebrush" is also used for several related members of the genus Artemisia, such as California sagebrush (Artemisia californica).

Big sagebrush and other Artemisia shrubs are the dominant plant species across large portions of the Great Basin. The range extends northward through British Columbia's southern interior, south into Baja California, and east into the western Great Plains of New Mexico, Colorado, Nebraska, and the Dakotas.

Several major threats exist to sagebrush ecosystems, including human settlements, conversion to agricultural land, livestock grazing, invasive plant species, and  wildfires.

Sagebrush provides food and habitat for a variety of species, such as sage grouse, pronghorn antelope, grey vireo, pygmy rabbit, and mule deer. It is especially important to game animals during the winter.

Native Americans used the plant medicinally. It is also useful as firewood.

Description
A deep taproot  in length, coupled with laterally spreading roots near the surface, allows sagebrush to gather water from both surface precipitation and the water table several meters beneath. Big sagebrush that is over a meter tall is an indicator of arable land, because it prefers deep, basic soils. Sagebrush is generally long-lived once it makes it past the seedling stage, and can reach ages of over 100 years.

The species has a strong pungent fragrance (especially when wet) due to the presence of camphor, terpenoids and other volatile oils. The taste is bitter and, together with the odor, serves to discourage browsing by many herbivores. It is an evergreen shrub, keeping some of its leaves year-round (although it loses many of them in the late summer). The leaves are covered with fine silvery hairs.

The plant flowers in the late summer or early fall. The small yellow flowers are in long, loosely arranged tubular clusters. The fruits are seed-like and have a small amount of hairs on the surface.

Big sagebrush can also reproduce through sprouts, which shoot up from the underground rhizome. The sprouts are an extension of the parental plant while seedlings are completely individualistic to any other plant. Among these two strategies, the seedlings need more moisture for germination and early survival. This is due to the sprouts being connected to already healthy and associated plants while the new seedlings will start anew.

Chemistry 
Sagebrush essential oil contains approximately 40% l-camphor; 20% pinene; 7% cineole; 5% methacrolein; and 12% a-terpinene, d-camphor, and sesqiterpenoids.

Taxonomy 
Much discussion and disagreement revolves around the question of how to divide the species into varieties and subgenera. The following subspecies are accepted by some authors, though others advocate different systems.
 A. tridentata subsp. tridentata ("basin big sagebrush")
 A. tridentata subsp. vaseyana ("mountain big sagebrush")
 A. tridentata subsp. wyomingensis ("Wyoming big sagebrush") – Found in the drier portions of the sagebrush steppe. Shrub density is generally less than 1 plant/m2, with little herbaceous cover surrounding the shrub.
 A. tridentata subsp. xericensis ("scabland big sagebrush")
 A. tridentata subsp. spiciformis ("subalpine big sagebrush")
 A. tridentata subsp. parishii ("Parish's big sagebrush")

Ecology

Artemisia tridentata grows in arid and semi-arid conditions, throughout the Intermountain West of North America. Sagebrush is not a desert plant, but rather a resident of the steppe, in areas that receive  of annual precipitation. Sagebrush provides food and habitat for a variety of animal species, such as sage grouse, pronghorn, gray vireo, pygmy rabbit, and mule deer. Sagebrush also creates habitat for many species of grasses and herbs. Besides providing shade and shelter from the wind, the long taproot of sagebrush draws water up from deep in the soil, some of which becomes available to these surrounding shallow-rooted plants.

The terpenoid compounds in big sagebrush are thought to ward off herbivores. These oils, at high concentrations, are toxic to the symbiotic bacteria in the rumen of some ruminants like deer and cattle. Pronghorn are the only large herbivore to browse sagebrush extensively. Damage to sagebrush plants caused by grazing herbivores results in the release of volatile chemicals, which are used to signal a warning to nearby plants, so that they can increase the production of repellent chemical compounds. This plant-to-plant communication can take place at distances of up to 60 cm.

Several major threats exist to sage brush ecosystems, including human settlements, conversion to agricultural land, livestock grazing, invasive plant species, wildfires, and climate change. The cattle industry burns large areas of sagebrush habitat to make way for grazing animals. Due to large periods of time where sagebrush was the primary shrub, many species have become adapted to this habitat. The burning of the shrubs leads to habitat loss of many species and can be very detrimental to the ecosystem as a whole. Furthermore, the destruction of native grasses and forbs by grazing and fire creates conditions where invasive plants colonize the area. The invasive species which has destroyed the largest amount of sagebrush habitat is cheatgrass (Bromus tectorum). Since its accidental introduction in the 1890s, cheatgrass has radically altered the native shrub ecosystem by replacing indigenous vegetation, and by creating a fire cycle that is too frequent to allow sagebrush to re-establish itself. Sagebrush is not fire-tolerant and relies on wind-blown seeds from outside the burned area for re-establishment. Some tree species have also been encroaching on big sagebrush habitat. For example, in the Warner Mountains in California white fir (Abies concolor) has been out-competing big sagebrush.

Toxicity
The plant's oils are toxic to the liver and digestive system of humans if taken internally, so care must be taken during any form of internal use. Generally, toxic symptoms will subside 24–48 hours after ingesting the plant.

Uses
The Cahuilla used to gather large quantities of sagebrush seed and grind it to make flour. The main modern use is as firewood, with the wood's oils being particularly flammable.

Medicinal 
The plant's active medicinal constituents include camphor, terpenoids, and tannins.

It is used as an herbal medicine by Native Americans throughout the Intermountain West of North America, most notably as a smudging herb. It is also used for preventing infection in wounds, stopping internal bleeding, and treating headaches and colds.

The Navajo use the vapors of sagebrush as a treatment for headache. The Okanagan and Colville people used sagebrush to smoke hides.

Among the Zuni people, an infusion of the leaves is used externally for body aches. The infusion is also taken as a cold medicine. It is also placed in shoes to treat athlete's foot, fissures between toes, and as a foot deodorant.

Culture
A. tridentata is the state flower of Nevada.

See also
 Great Basin Desert
 Medicinal plants of the American West

References

External links
 
 
 
 GIS Database for Sage Grouse and Shrubsteppe Management in the Intermountain West
 Jepson eFlora (TJM2) treatment of Artemisia tridentata
 The Sagebrush Sea 

tridentata
Flora of the Northwestern United States
Flora of the North-Central United States
Flora of the Southwestern United States
Flora of Western Canada
Flora of the California desert regions
Flora of the Great Basin
Flora of New Mexico
Flora of the Sierra Nevada (United States)
Natural history of the California chaparral and woodlands
Plants described in 1841
Plants used in traditional Native American medicine
Forages
Flora without expected TNC conservation status